Bialobrzeski  (Polish: Białobrzescy) of Abdank coat of arms is the name of a Polish noble family.

History 
According to legend, the family was among envoys of Bolesław III Wrymouth. In 1998 about 2000 inhabitants lived in Poland, bearing the name Bialobrzeski. Those live in areas around Warsaw and Wroclaw, but especially in the north-eastern Poland. For the reign of John III Sobieski family members of the Bialobrzeski were official delegates of sejmik in the sejm.

After the three partitions of Poland the Bialobrzeski own less land and some properties (e.g. in Tuszyn). As a result of uprisings in the 19th Century in partitioned Poland Bialobrzeski lost even more land.

One of the best known members of the family that lived in the region Sieradz, is Casimir Bialobrzeski, who was important in the introduction of the telephone network in Poland before the World War II.

Polish noble families
Clan Abdank